Events from the year 1588 in Ireland.

Incumbent
Monarch: Elizabeth I

Events
June 28 – Sir Valentine Browne purchases estates, including the Lakes of Killarney, from the estate of Donald Maccarty, 1st Earl of Clancare.
Autumn/Winter – much of the retreating Spanish Armada gets washed up on the Irish coast. MacSweeney Bannagh gives assistance to La Girona at Killybegs but on October 26 she is wrecked off County Antrim with only 9 survivors from an estimated 1300 onboard (including survivors from earlier wrecks). Brian O'Rourke assists at least eighty survivors – including Francisco de Cuellar – to depart the country.
Richard Boyle, 1st Earl of Cork and father of Robert Boyle, arrives in Ireland as an entrepreneur.
Lord Deputy William Fitzwilliam becomes Lord Deputy of Ireland, succeeding John Perrot in that office.

Births
 Luke Wadding, Franciscan friar and historian (d. 1657)

References

 
1580s in Ireland
Ireland
Years of the 16th century in Ireland